The 1916 North Ayrshire by-election was held on 11 October 1916.  The by-election was held due to the death of the incumbent Conservative MP, Duncan Campbell, who died from wounds sustained in the First World War.  It was won by the Conservative candidate Aylmer Hunter-Weston.

Chalmers was supported by the Union of Democratic Control and contested the 1918 general election as a Labour Party candidate.

References

1916 in Scotland
1910s elections in Scotland
Politics of Ayrshire
1916 elections in the United Kingdom
Ayrshire, North
October 1916 events